Emilio Gómez may refer to:

Emilio Gómez Muriel (1910-1985), Mexican film director
Emilio Gómez (footballer) (born 1958), Spanish footballer
Emilio Gómez (tennis) (born 1991), Ecuadorian tennis player

See also
Emilia Gómez Bravo (born 1954), Mexican politician